Karsten Lund (12 November 1943 – 27 May 2015) is a Danish former football (soccer) player, who played 310 games and scored 140 goals for Vejle Boldklub. He played four games and scored two goals for the Denmark national football team.

References

External links
Danish national team profile
 Vejle Boldklub profile

1943 births
2015 deaths
Danish men's footballers
Vejle Boldklub players
Denmark international footballers
Association football forwards